The Furniture Industry Research Association (FIRA), is a United Kingdom research association which serves the furniture industry.

Research and consultancy services

FIRA research and development programmes feed into British, European and international standards for performance and testing; FIRA experts represent the UK on several standards committees. This enables its furniture testing laboratory to apply internationally recognised techniques when testing components, materials and finished products to ascertain performance safety and durability. International recognition also means FIRA testing certificates are accepted worldwide.

FIRA's expertise is available on a consultancy basis for business process improvement, ergonomics and environmental management issues. It also provides advice to consumers through its FIRA Service Technicians division.

In October 2019 it published a new standard for bariatric beds for people  weighing between 150 kg and 250 kg.

Membership

FIRA has three categories of membership: full, international and associate:
Full membership is open to UK manufacturers, retailers and major suppliers of furniture.
International membership is open to overseas manufacturers, distributors and suppliers who may be seeking a UK market presence.
Associate membership is open to non-manufacturing organisations such as specifiers and end-users of furniture.

Industry involvement

FIRA used to share its offices with The Furniture Ombudsman, an independent non-statutory organisation which was set up in 2014.

In 2006 FIRA was a founder member of the British Furniture Confederation lobby group.

References

External links
  FIRA International
  The Furniture Ombudsman
  FIRA Service Technicians

1949 establishments in the United Kingdom
British furniture
British research associations
Organisations based in Hertfordshire
Research institutes established in 1949
Research institutes in Hertfordshire
Companies based in Stevenage
Trade associations based in the United Kingdom